Penuguduru is situated in Karapa mandal, Kakinada district, in Andhra Pradesh State, India.

References

Villages in Kakinada district